Croton Falls may refer to:
 Croton Falls, New York, a hamlet in North Salem, New York, United States
 Croton Falls (Metro-North station), serving Croton Falls, New York
 Croton Falls Reservoir, in Putnam County, New York